The Postniki (постники "fasters") were a millennial sect of 19th century Southern Russia, a branch of the Khlysty (flagellants) movement, founded by  Abbakum (or Avvakum) Ivanov Kopylov (Аббакум / Аввакум Копылов, 1756–1838), a peasant of the  Tambov Oblast. Kopylov declared himself the living Christ and gathered a considerable following in the 1820s. After Kopylov's death in 1838, the sect disintegrated in various schisms, giving rise to follow-up groups such as the Staroizrail (Old Israel) sect led by Kopylov's disciple Perfil Katasonov.

Soviet scholar A.I. Klibanov still encountered several postniki  in Rasskazovo  in 1959.

External links
https://web.archive.org/web/20080416165643/http://www.doukhobor.org/New-Israel.htm
http://www.molokane.org/molokan/Religion/Dekhtevich_Khlysty.html
Khlysts